The Türmchen (Little tower) in Ehrenbach, an Ortsteil of Idstein, Hesse, Germany, is a fachwerk building from around 1780 that served various purposes. The listed historic monument has been a Protestant chapel from 1982.

History 

The Türmchen was built around 1780 on an elevated property as a Hirtenhaus (shepherds' house).

The building belongs to the town of Idstein.The street address is Malbachweg 1. In 19821, it was consecrated as a chapel, and now serves for monthly church services of the Oberauroff/Görsroth/Eschenhahn parish of the Protestant Church in Hesse and Nassau. The building was completely restored over two years beginning in 2019. It is a listed historic monument.

Building 

The Türmchen is located on a level higher than the street, supported by a wall. Based on a high foundation of Bruchstein (quarry stone), it is a fachwerk (timber-framed) construction with a gable roof, with a ridge turret to the east. The slated little steeple explains the common name. The only entrance carrying on the south side is reached by stairs. An original second door was made a wall. The building houses a single simple rectangular room.

References

External links 

 Stadtteil Ehrenbach (Idstein) (in German) kuladig.de 2021

1780s architecture
Protestant churches in Hesse
Buildings and structures in Rheingau-Taunus-Kreis
Timber-framed churches